Harmony Grove is an unincorporated community in Monongalia County, West Virginia, United States.

It is the location of the Harmony Grove Meeting House, listed on the National Register of Historic Places in 1983.

References 

Unincorporated communities in West Virginia
Unincorporated communities in Monongalia County, West Virginia